Z. I. M. Mostofa Ali is a Bangladesh Nationalist Party politician and the former Member of Parliament of Bogra-4.

Career
Ali was elected to parliament from Bogra-4 as a Bangladesh Nationalist Party candidate in 2008. He served in the Parliamentary Standing committee on health and family welfare ministry.

References

Bangladesh Nationalist Party politicians
Living people
9th Jatiya Sangsad members
Year of birth missing (living people)